Pyrgocythara eminula is an extinct species of sea snail, a marine gastropod mollusk in the family Mangeliidae.

Description
The length of the shell attains 4.3 mm, its diameter 1.8 mm.

Distribution
Fossils of this marine species were found in Pleistocene strata of Jamaica and St. Thomas; age range: 3.6 to 2.588 Ma

References

 W. P. Woodring. 1928. Miocene Molluscs from Bowden, Jamaica. Part 2: Gastropods and discussion of results . Contributions to the Geology and Palaeontology of the West Indies.
 A. J. W. Hendy, D. P. Buick, K. V. Bulinski, C. A. Ferguson, and A. I. Miller. 2008. Unpublished census data from Atlantic coastal plain and circum-Caribbean Neogene assemblages and taxonomic opinions.

External links
 Fossilsworks : † Pyrgocythara eminula Woodring 1928

eminula
Gastropods described in 1928